Chaa may refer to:

People
 Lady Chaa

Places
 Chaa Creek, Belize
 Chaa-Khol, Russia

Other
 CHAA-FM, Canadian radio station